A by-election was held for the Kelantan State Assembly seat of Pengkalan Kubor on 25 September 2014 following the nomination day on 13 September 2014. The seat fell vacant after the death of the incumbent three-term assemblyman, Noor Zahidi Omar from liver cancer in Guangzhou, China on 20 August 2014. Zahidi was an assemblyman from the United Malays National Organisation, a component party of the opposition Barisan Nasional coalition. In the 2013 general election, he defeated Pakatan Rakyat (PKR) candidate Saharun Ibrahim and an independent candidate by 1,736 votes.

Mat Razi Mat Ail from UMNO represented Barisan Nasional. Pakatan Rakyat was represented by Wan Rosdi Wan Ibrahim from PAS. Independent candidate Izat Bukhary Ismail Bukhary will also be contesting the seat. A total of 24,039 voters can vote in the by-election.

Results

References 

Politics of Kelantan
2014 elections in Malaysia
2014 Pengkalan Kubor by-election
Elections in Kelantan